Ali Izmailovich Ibrahimov (1913–1985) was the chairman of the Council of Ministers of the Azerbaijan Soviet Socialist Republic from 10 April 1970 to 22 January 1981.

In 2013 a Scientific-Theoretical Conference was held at the Ministry of Economy of the Republic of Azerbaijan to mark the 100th anniversary of Ibrahimov's birth.

See also
Prime Minister of Azerbaijan

References

1913 births
1985 deaths
Azerbaijani communists
Azerbaijani politicians
Azerbaijan State Oil and Industry University alumni
Sixth convocation members of the Supreme Soviet of the Soviet Union
Seventh convocation members of the Supreme Soviet of the Soviet Union
Eighth convocation members of the Supreme Soviet of the Soviet Union
Ninth convocation members of the Supreme Soviet of the Soviet Union
Tenth convocation members of the Supreme Soviet of the Soviet Union
Recipients of the Order of Lenin
Recipients of the Order of the Red Banner of Labour
Heads of the government of the Azerbaijan Soviet Socialist Republic
Members of the Supreme Soviet of the Azerbaijan Soviet Socialist Republic